The Chance is a concert and theater complex located in downtown Poughkeepsie, New York. The complex consists of four rooms: the Chance Theater, which is the primary concert hall; The Loft, a smaller upstairs concert hall; The Platinum Lounge, a downstairs bar/nightclub; and The Nuddy Irishmen, a downstairs cafe/bar.

History
The theater opened in 1912 under the name the "Carroll Players Playhouse", and in 1928, changed its name to the "Playhouse Theatre". It primarily featured older silent films in its early days. The theater closed in 1945, but reopened once more in 1970 when Larry Plover turned the film stages into a music venue. It was also closed from 1977 through 1980, finally changing its name to The Chance. The theater is owned by Frank Pallett, who purchased the venue in 1994.

The theater now has its own radio show, which airs internationally on iHeartRadio and local dial WBWZ.

Dave Price listed this as one of the "Top 10 things" he "loved about Poughkeepsie" in a 2005 Poughkeepsie Journal article.

References

Buildings and structures in Poughkeepsie, New York
Theatres completed in 1912
Music venues in New York (state)